Ankurhati is a census town in Domjur CD Block of Howrah Sadar subdivision in Howrah district in the Indian state of West Bengal. It is a part of Kolkata Urban Agglomeration.

Geography

Demographics
As per 2011 Census of India Ankurhati had a total population of 11,130 of which 5,750 (52%) were males and 5,380 (48%) were females. Population below 6 years was 1,401. The total number of literates in Ankurhati was 8,136 (83.63% of the population over 6 years).

Ankurhati was part of Kolkata Urban Agglomeration in 2011 census.
  
 India census, Ankurhati had a population of 7787. Males constitute 53% of the population and females 47%. Ankurhati has an average literacy rate of 71%, higher than the national average of 59.5%; with 56% of the males and 44% of females literate. 13% of the population is under 6 years of age.

Transport
Ankurhati is the junction of National Highway 16 (part of Asian Highway 45) and Makardaha-Mahiari Road. People can easily go to several areas of Kolkata, Howrah and Hooghly from here.

Bus

Private Bus
 40 Birshibpur - Serampore
 79 Panchla - Dunlop
 E43 Dihibhursut - Howrah Station
 E53 Narit - Howrah Station
 L3 Jhikhira/Muchighata - Howrah Station

CTC Bus
 E6 Amta - Esplanade
 E7 Bagnan railway station - Esplanade
Many Shuttle Buses (Without Numbers) also pass through Ankurhati.

Train
Santragachi Junction is the nearest railway station.

References

Cities and towns in Howrah district
Neighbourhoods in Kolkata
Kolkata Metropolitan Area